Adesmia arachnipes is an endemic perennial herb found in Chile.

References

arachnipes